is an arcade game developed and published by Capcom in 1996 as a sequel to Dungeons & Dragons: Tower of Doom. The game is set in the Dungeons & Dragons campaign setting of Mystara.

Combining the side-scrolling gameplay of a beat 'em up with some aspects found in a role-playing video game, Shadow over Mystara has many game mechanics not commonly found in arcade games, such as finding and equipping new gear and earning new spells as the player gains experience. Players can wield a large variety of weapons and armor, although this selection is limited by the character the players chooses; there is also an extensive assortment of magical and hidden items in the game, many of which are completely unknown to exist to the typical video gamer. This, along with the addition of multiple endings and forking paths, gives the game much re-playability and has led to a cult following among fans of the genre.

It was one of the last 2-D arcade side-scrollers created by Capcom; only Battle Circuit (1997) came after Shadow over Mystara. The game has seen two home releases as part of the compilations: Dungeons & Dragons Collection published for the Sega Saturn in 1999, and Dungeons & Dragons: Chronicles of Mystara made available on the Nintendo eShop, PlayStation Network, Xbox Live Arcade and Steam in 2013.

Gameplay

In addition to the original four heroes found in its predecessor, Dungeons & Dragons: Tower of Doom (Cleric, Dwarf, Elf and Fighter), Shadow of Mystara adds a Thief and a Magic-User to the selection of player characters. Furthermore, with the inclusion of two separate versions of each character's sprite set, the game allows up to two players to select the same character (in Tower of Doom each of the characters could only be selected once), effectively giving the game 12 "different" characters to choose from. The two Clerics and two Magic Users also have subtle differences within their spell books.

The controls use four buttons: Attack, Jump, Select (brings up a small inventory ring around the character allowing the player to choose what item is set in the Use slot) and Use. The Cleric, Elf and Magic-User also have two extra rings for their spells, with the Jump button used to switch from ring to ring. While the game uses the same kick harness as the previous game, the Select and Use buttons are reversed.

Shadow over Mystara also introduced a selection of special moves which are executed by moving the joystick and tapping the buttons in certain combinations, in a way similar to the Street Fighter series. The characters (except for the Magic-User) have a Dashing Attack as well as a Rising Attack which can be used to combo monsters or even juggle them in the air. Most characters (again, with the exception of the Magic-User and also Cleric) also have a Megacrush, a move common to nearly all of Capcom side-scrollers, which damages all enemies standing close enough to the character but in turn also damaging the player themselves.

The game offers a small selection of arcane magic, available for the Magic-User and Elf, and divine magic, available to the Cleric. Instead of an MP system, characters use D&Ds Vancian magic system where a certain amount of each spell ready to cast. Extra uses of the spells can be picked up off the ground, represented graphically as scrolls of paper, or occasionally recharged after certain boss fights. When a spell is cast the entire game is momentarily paused during which the spell effect is played out (some spells can be controlled during this time).

Every character starts with their armor (the second slot) already filled, specific to their character, and remains unchanged the entire game. The character's helmet (the first slot) and shield (the fifth slot) are the other two items that lend to a character's defensive ability. Most characters also begin with a shield, except the Magic-User and Thief, who cannot use shields. While magical items in traditional D&D rules are practically invulnerable or tough, the magical items in Shadow over Mystara are very fragile. Magical boots (slot three), gauntlets (slot four), and rings (slot six) are all destroyed after the player is damaged a few times. The eighth slot is used for miscellaneous items, such as the "Skin of the Displacer Beast" or the "Eye of the Beholder"; many bosses drop rare items such as these and they either grant special abilities or can be traded in for special magical equipment. There are also many unique hidden items (for example, hidden near the end of the game is a treasure chest which contains the Staff of Wizardry when opened by the Magic-User: if the Magic-User wields the staff during the final boss fight and there are at least three players with a combined total of over 1 million experience points, the Staff will glow and the team will be able to use the powerful Final Strike attack).

In between many stages the players find themselves inside small town stores where they can restock on common items such as arrows, burning oils, throwing daggers and healing potions. Players can sell items for gold and also trade special items found during boss battles with shopkeepers (by clicking on the shopkeepers head) to earn unique magical items. The players can also come across a special gnome village where the townfolk beg to be saved from a chimera (the gnomes, unlike traditional Dungeons & Dragons gnomes, are very minuscule, standing about a foot tall).

Plot
After defeating the Arch Lich Deimos, the heroes continued on their journey through the Broken Lands of Glantri after realizing that Deimos was only part of an even greater evil plan, and he was in fact being used by a mysterious sorceress named Synn. Synn, who appears to be a young woman but commands incredibly powerful magical abilities, has been scheming to control the Kingdom of Glantri and conquer the humanoids of the Republic of Darokin. But now that Deimos has been defeated, Synn vowed to punish the land that she desired.

At the game's end the player discovers that Synn is in fact a centuries-old red dragon, bent on harnessing the mystical forces of the lands she has conquered, in order to awaken a creature of even more devastating physical prowess than herself - known and described only as The Fiend. The heroes then fight against Synn in her lair; when she is slain, her monster is also destroyed by an airship bombing.

Characters

Cleric (default name Greldon / Miles*): The Cleric's role is to be the party's healer and buffer, but he is also a formidable warrior, possessing the best rushing attack in the game. He also has the ability to turn undead, instantly destroying skeletons and ghouls, and can cast from a large library of clerical spells that can heal, strengthen allies, and debilitate or damage enemies. In line with classic Dungeons & Dragons rules, the cleric cannot wield any weapon that is bladed; however, he can wield a spiked morningstar from which he gains new special attacks.
Dwarf (default name Dimsdale / Hendel*): The Dwarf is a hardy character that has the most hit points in the game, and is able to deal the most physical damage in a short amount of time. His short stature allows him to safely pass under enemy projectiles. The Dwarf has strengths that lie in his special attacks rather than his normal attacks; he also has the unique ability to bash opened treasure chests to reveal extra gold and treasure.
Elf (default name Lucia / Kayla*): The Elf is a female fighter-mage, combining the offense of a Fighter with the spells of a Magic-user. Although her capabilities in such are less powerful than that of the Fighter and Magic-User respectively, she remains a versatile and useful character. Her disadvantages are her low constitution and defense, and the shortest melee weapon reach in the game; the Elf's attack hitbox remains the same and is not improved even when using weapons longer than her default short sword. Much like the Dwarf, she reaches her maximum level fairly early in the game, which gives her an early advantage but just as well halts her progression abruptly and reduces the effectiveness of consumable magic items such as the Bottle of Efreet.
Fighter (default name Crassus / Jarred*): The Fighter is a melee character with an excellent moveset, long weapon reach, high endurance, and the best armor class, making him suitable for beginners and experts alike. He can wield nearly every weapon in the game, including the two-handed sword, and is the only character with the ability to dual-wield with a short sword in his offhand. The Sword of Legends item in the game is named after the highest ranking Fighter in the high scores.
Magic-User (default name Syous / D'raven*): The Magic-User is a master of devastating spells but is physically the weakest character in the game; as such, he is quick to die when played by novices due to his low constitution and relatively weak melee abilities. To offset his low amount of health, the Magic-User has a useful teleportation move which allows him to dodge all physical attacks (and can be used to perform elaborate and damaging combos by experienced players), along with a spell that grants him temporary invulnerability. The Magic-User is a difficult but rewarding character to use that requires previous knowledge of the game and effective management of his spells. His offensive spells are greatly enhanced by the Staff of Wizardry, arguably making him the most powerful character in the game.
Thief (default name Moriah / Shannon*): The female Thief is a quick and dexterous warrior with many unique acrobatic skills, such as a double jump, wall jump, back flip, and leap across the screen. She has the abilities to pick locks, detect traps, pickpocket enemies, and even back stab enemies for severe damage. The Thief also has an unlimited supply of rocks to sling with and utilizes flasks of burning oil in some of her special attacks. However, she suffers defensively due to her moderate constitution and lack of a shield. The Thief has the highest maximum level in the game and thus benefits the most from consumable magic items, such as the Bottle of Efreet, that increase in effectiveness with the character level.
 Default name playing with second version of these characters.

Players, upon completion of their first stage, are prompted to enter a character name. Unlike many games at the time which only allow a person to enter three letters, Shadow over Mystara has space for six. The game provides a default name for each of the characters; the default name is also automatically used if the player tries to submit a blank name or use vulgarity.

Release
The arcade version of the game was released in 1996. The guide/art book was published by Shinseisha in the Gamest Mook series that same year.

Dungeons & Dragons Collection
Dungeons & Dragons Collection is a two-disc compilation of Tower of Doom and Shadow over Mystara. It was released only in Japan on March 4, 1999, exclusively for the Sega Saturn. The ports have minor differences in gameplay, and there is a maximum of two players instead of the original four. Originally Capcom had planned to release Tower of Doom as a standalone title on Sega Saturn and Sony PlayStation, but cancelled the plan early on. It was initially announced that the collection would be released for both the Saturn and PlayStation, with the PlayStation version due for a U.S. release, but the PlayStation version was never completed.

In 1999, GameSpot's James Mielke criticized the loading times: "despite its use of the 4-Meg RAM Cart, loading times are horrendous, with mid-level battles occasionally pausing to let data stream in", and summarized that "as a very basic scrolling hacker, this game is simply OK. It's not bad, especially if you have a friend to help you play, but you can hardly look at this game as anything other than average". In 2005, IGN picked the Dungeons & Dragons Collection as one of the top ten co-op games. Retro Gamer included it on their list of ten essential Saturn imports, praising its "stunning animation thanks to using the 4MB ram pack" and opining that "while this does suffer from lengthy loading times, it remains the best scrolling fighter on the system, just beating Taito's delightfully odd PuLiRuLa and Capcom's own Dynasty Warriors. [sic - The Retro Gamer team are confusing Dynasty Warriors with Dynasty Wars.]" In 2023, Time Extension included the collection on their top 25 "Best Beat 'Em Ups of All Time" list.

Dungeons & Dragons: Chronicles of Mystara

Capcom announced at PAX East 2013 that they would release Tower of Doom and Shadow over Mystara as part of the Dungeons & Dragons: Chronicles of Mystara compilation on Wii U, PlayStation 3, Xbox 360 and Microsoft Windows.

Reception 

Dungeons & Dragons: Shadow over Mystara has been very well received. In Japan, Game Machine listed the game on their April 1, 1996 issue as being the sixth most-popular arcade game at the time. On release, a reviewer for Next Generation said it "is full of the stuff that made the first so fun." He further said that the game had refined Dungeons & Dragons: Tower of Doom, improving the animation quality to X-Men: Children of the Atom level, expanding the number of playable characters, adding more stage branches and endings to create deeper gameplay and story, and incorporating more interesting character abilities such as wielding two swords. Despite this, he gave it only three out of five stars. Wataru Maruyama of VideoGames praised the game's "astounding" graphical details and called it "Capcom's latest masterpiece". According to Allen Rausch of GameSpy in 2004, "Shadows Over Mystara was a stellar game back when arcades were still a good place to find the hottest games. And it's still fun today." Spanish website MeriStation also gave it a positive retrospective outlook. Both Tower of Doom and Shadow over Mystara have since gained a cult following.

Retro Gamer ranked Dungeons & Dragons: Shadow over Mystara as the sixteenth top retro arcade game. In 2011, GameSpy ranked the game as number 50 on their list of the top arcade games, calling it "one of the most purely entertaining titles ever released for any platform." In 2013, the title was ranked as the eighteenth top beat 'em up video game of all time by Heavy.com. Kotaku included it among the best looking beat 'em up games from the 16-bit era. IGN ranked Shadow Over Mystara number 9 on their list of "The Top 11 Dungeons & Dragons Games of All Time" in 2014.

References

External links

FantasyAnime's D&D section - covers both D&D video games with full character bios, multimedia downloads, and an interview with one of the developers.

1996 video games
Action role-playing video games
Arcade video games
Cancelled PlayStation (console) games
Capcom beat 'em ups
Cooperative video games
CP System II games
Dungeons & Dragons video games
Head-to-head arcade video games
Multiplayer and single-player video games
Mystara
Role-playing video games
Sega Saturn games
Side-scrolling beat 'em ups
Video game sequels
Video games about dragons
Video games developed in Japan
Video games featuring female protagonists
Video games scored by Masato Kouda